In mathematics and mathematical biology, the Mackey–Glass equations, named after Michael Mackey and Leon Glass, refer to a family of delay differential equations whose behaviour manages to mimic both healthy and pathological behaviour in certain biological contexts, controlled by the equation's parameters. Originally, they were used to model the variation in the relative quantity of mature cells in the blood. The equations are defined as:
 
and
 

Equation, in particular, is notable in dynamical systems since it can result in chaotic attractors with various dimensions.

Introduction

There exist an enormous number of physiological systems that involve or rely on the periodic behaviour of certain subcomponents of the system. For example, many homeostatic processes rely on negative feedback to control the concentration of substances in the blood; breathing, for instance, is promoted by the detection, by the brain, of high CO2 concentration in the blood. One way to model such systems mathematically is with the following simple ordinary differential equation:

where  is the rate at which a "substance" is produced, and  controls how the current level of the substance discourages the continuation of its production. The solutions of this equation can be found via an integrating factor, and have the form:

where  is any initial condition for the initial value problem.

However, the above model assumes that variations in the substance concentration is detected immediately, which often not the case in physiological systems. In order to ease this problem,  proposed changing the production rate to a function  of the concentration at an earlier point  in time, in hope that this would better reflect the fact that there is a significant delay before the bone marrow produces and releases mature cells in the blood, after detecting low cell concentration in the blood. By taking the production rate  as being:

This is why, in this context, plots often place  in the -axis.

Dynamical behaviour

It is of interest to study the behaviour of the equation solutions when  is varied, since it represents the time taken by the physiological system to react to the concentration variation of a substance. An increase in this delay can be caused by a pathology, which in turn can result in chaotic solutions for the Mackey–Glass equations, especially Equation. When , we obtain a very regular periodic solution, which can be seen as characterizing "healthy" behaviour; on the other hand, when  the solution gets much more erratic.

The Mackey–Glass attractor can be visualized by plotting the pairs . This is somewhat justified because delay differential equations can (sometimes) be reduced to a system of ordinary differential equations, and also because they are approximately infinite dimensional maps.

See also
 Circadian rhythm
 Circadian oscillator
 Neural oscillation

References

Chaotic maps